Uganda competed in the 2014 Commonwealth Games in Glasgow, Scotland from 23 July to 3 August 2014.

Athletics

Men

Women

Badminton

Mixed team

Pool B

Rugby sevens

Uganda has qualified a rugby sevens team.

Swimming

Men

Women

Weightlifting

Men

Women

 Powerlifting

References

Nations at the 2014 Commonwealth Games
Uganda at the Commonwealth Games
2014 in Ugandan sport